Scheps is a natural landscape in the municipality of Balen, Antwerp Province, Belgium.

Located on the valley of the Grote Nete, between Olmen and Scheps, in this territory can be found several plants such as the marsh cinquefoil and the calla, and birds like the common kingfisher, the European stonechat and the bluethroat.

References

External links
 Folder Scheps
 Scheps

Geography of Antwerp Province
Balen